The 2014–15 season of the Swiss 1. Liga was the 93rd season of the fourth tier of the Swiss football league system.

Tables

Group 1

Group 2

Group 3

Promotion play-offs

SC Kriens and SC Cham were promoted to the 2015–16 1. Liga Promotion.

References

External links 
  

Switzerland
4